James "Jim"/"Jimmy" Ledgard (9 June 1922 – 26 January 2007) was an English rugby union and World Cup winning professional rugby league footballer who played in the 1940s, 1950s and 1960s, and coached rugby league in the 1960s. He played club level rugby union (RU) for Sandal RUFC, and representative level rugby league (RL) for Great Britain, England and Yorkshire, and at club level for Dewsbury (two spells), and Leigh, as a goal-kicking , i.e. number 1, and coached at club level for Bradford Northern.

He was transferred from Dewsbury to Leigh for a record fee of £2,650 during January 1948, (based on increases in average earnings, this would be approximately £218,400 in 2013).

Ledgard made 334 appearances for Leigh after joining the club from Dewsbury in 1948, scoring a record 1,043 goals for the club as well as 36 tries. He played for the club until 1958.

He was part of the Great Britain side that won the 1954 World Cup, winning his 11th and last cap in the 16-12 win over France in the final.

Background
Jimmy Ledgard was born in Wakefield, West Riding of Yorkshire, England, and he died aged 84 in Dewsbury, West Yorkshire, England.

Playing career

International honours
Jimmy Ledgard won caps for England while at Dewsbury in 1947 against France (2 matches), and Wales, while at Leigh in 1948 against Wales, in 1949 against France, and Other Nationalities, in 1951 against Wales, and France, in 1952 against Other Nationalities (2 matches), and Wales, in 1953 against Wales, in 1955 against Other Nationalities, and won caps for Great Britain while at Dewsbury in 1947 against New Zealand (2 matches), while at Leigh in 1948 against Australia, in 1950 against Australia (2 matches), and New Zealand, in 1951 against New Zealand, and in the 1954 Rugby League World Cup against France (5-goals), Australia (2-goals), New Zealand (1-try, 4-goals), France (2-goals) (World Cup 1954 4-caps, 1-try, 13-goals).

Jimmy Ledgard played  in all four of Great Britain's 1954 Rugby League World Cup matches, including Great Britain’s 16-12 victory over France in the 1954 Rugby League World Cup Final at Parc des Princes, Paris on 13 November 1954.

As of December 2016, With 23 goals, Jimmy is 5th in the list of England's all-time Goal Scorers (behind Kevin Sinfield, George Fairbairn, Andrew Farrell and Ernest Ward, and with 52 points he is 8th in the list of England's all-time Point Scorers (behind Kevin Sinfield George Fairbairn, Ryan Hall, Andrew Farrell, Sam Tomkins, Rob Burrow, and  Ernest Ward).

County honours

Jimmy Ledgard played  in Yorkshire's 3-12 defeat by Lancashire in the 1949 County Championship Final during the 1948–49 season at Thrum Hall, Halifax on Tuesday 3 May 1949, in front of a crowd of 7,000.

Championship final appearances
Jimmy Ledgard played , and scored a drop goal in Dewsbury's 4-13 defeat by Wigan in the Championship Final during the 1946–47 season at Maine Road, Manchester on Saturday 21 June 1947.

County Cup Final appearances
Jimmy Ledgard played , and scored 2-goals in Leigh's 7-20 defeat by Wigan in the 1949–50 Lancashire County Cup Final during the 1949–50 season at Wilderspool Stadium, Warrington on Saturday 29 October 1949, and played  in the 6-14 defeat by Wigan in the 1951–52 Lancashire County Cup Final during the 1951–52 season at Station Road, Swinton on Saturday 27 October 1951.

Coaching

References

External links
(archived by archive.is) When League was the new TV game
Obituary: Mr Jimmy Ledgard
Obituary at independent.co.uk
Obituary at yorkshirepost.co.uk
Leigh mourn passing of former player, Albert Moore
Sporting Numbers 3,279

1922 births
2007 deaths
Bradford Bulls coaches
Dewsbury Rams players
England national rugby league team players
English rugby league coaches
English rugby league players
English rugby union players
Great Britain national rugby league team players
Leigh Leopards captains
Leigh Leopards players
Rugby league players from Wakefield
Rugby league fullbacks
Rugby union players from Wakefield
Yorkshire rugby league team players